The Kazakh ambassador in Beijing is the official representative of the Government in Astana to the Government of the People's Republic of China with a concurrent Diplomatic accreditation in Hanoi (Vietnam), Ulaanbaatar (Mongolia) and Pyongyang (North Korea).

List of representatives

References 

Kazakhstan
Ambassadors of Kazakhstan to China
China